Sir John Curzon, 3rd Baronet (1674 – 6 August 1727) of Kedleston, Derbyshire was an English Tory politician who sat in the English and British House of Commons for 27 years, between 1701 and 1727.

Curzon was the son of Sir Nathaniel Curzon, 2nd Baronet of Kedleston, and his wife, Sarah Penn, daughter of William Penn of Penn, Buckinghamshire. He matriculated at Trinity College, Oxford on 8 July 1690, aged 16 and was awarded BA in 1693. He was admitted at Inner Temple in 1692. 
  
Curzon was returned with Thomas Coke in a contest as Member of Parliament for Derbyshire at the second general election of 1701. He was classified as a Tory and was returned with Coke unopposed in the English general elections of 1702, and 1705 English general election. At the 1708 British general election, Curzon was returned with Coke again unopposed.  His only vote he recorded during that Parliament was against the impeachment of Dr Sacheverell. In June 1710, he presented a loyal address from Derbyshire, which was a calculated snub to Thomas Coke, who though a Tory was surrendering his principles to keep his lucrative public offices. At the 1710 British general election Curzon selected a new running mate and Coke went to stand elsewhere. Curzon was more active in this Parliament and was included among the 'Tory patriots' favouring peace, and as a 'worthy patriot' who had helped to detect the mismanagements of the previous ministry. He was also a member of the October Club. At the 1713 British general election, he was returned unopposed again, but his brother had joined him in the House of Commons, and it is not possible to distinguish their contributions. One of the Curzons was responsible for managing through Parliament a bill for the Trent navigation.

Curzon was returned again at the 1715 British general election. He succeeded his father in the baronetcy on 4 March 1719. He was returned again at the 1722 British general election. He died just before the dissolution for the 1727 general election.

 
Curzon was the first owner of Kedleston Hall to exploit the landscape potential, and commissioned Charles Bridgeman in the 1720s to create formal water features. He died on 7 August 1727 as a consequence of falling from his horse while out hunting three weeks previously and was buried at All Saints' Church, Kedleston. He was unmarried and was therefore succeeded by his brother Nathaniel.

References

1674 births
1727 deaths
Burials in Derbyshire
People from Derbyshire
Alumni of Trinity College, Oxford
Members of the Inner Temple
Baronets in the Baronetage of England
Baronets in the Baronetage of Nova Scotia
British MPs 1707–1708
British MPs 1708–1710
British MPs 1710–1713
British MPs 1713–1715
British MPs 1715–1722
British MPs 1722–1727
Tory MPs (pre-1834)
John
English MPs 1701–1702
English MPs 1702–1705
English MPs 1705–1707
Members of the Parliament of Great Britain for Derbyshire
Members of the Parliament of England for Derbyshire